Euphorbia aleppica is a species of plant in the family Euphorbiaceae.

References

aleppica
Plants described in 1753
Taxa named by Carl Linnaeus
Flora of Malta